The Ukrainians in Sweden refers to Swedish citizens of Ukrainian descent, or Ukraine-born people who emigrated to Sweden. They are an ethnic minority in Sweden. Ukrainian asylum seekers in Sweden increased considerably following the 2022 Russian invasion of Ukraine.

The Ukrainian diaspora, present in Sweden constituted a relatively small migrant group compared to other groups in Sweden of European descent before the 2022 Russian invasion of Ukraine. 

In 1999, there were 1,200 Ukrainians (born in Ukraine) in Sweden, and in 2021 that number had risen to 12,900. In 2010, the majority of Ukrainian nationals were women.

Notable people 

 Marina Schiptjenko

See also 

 Embassy of Ukraine, Stockholm
 Sweden–Ukraine relations

References 

Ethnic groups in Sweden
Sweden
Ukrainian diaspora in Europe
 
Sweden–Ukraine relations